Amphimeniidae is a family of solenogaster, a shell-less worm-like mollusk.

Genera
 Alexandromenia Heath, 1911
 Amphimenia Thiele, 1894
 Meromenia Leloup, 1949
 Pachymenia Heath, 1911
 Paragymnomenia Leloup, 1947
 Plathymenia Schwabl, 1961
 Proparamenia Nierstrasz, 1902
 Spengelomenia Heath, 1912
 Sputoherpia Salvini-Plawen, 1978
 Utralvoherpia Salvini-Plawen, 1978

References

 Salvini-Plawen, L.v. 1972. Zur Morphologie und Phylogenie der Mollusken: Die Beziehungen der Caudofoveata und der Solenogaster. Z. wiss. Zool., 184(3/4): 205-394
 García-Álvarez O. & Salvini-Plawen L.v. (2007). Species and diagnosis of the families and genera of Solenogastres (Mollusca). Iberus 25(2): 73-143.
 García-Álvarez O., Salvini-Plawen L.v., Urgorri V. & Troncoso J.S. (2014). Mollusca. Solenogastres, Caudofoveata, Monoplacophora. Fauna Iberica. 38: 1-294

Solenogastres